ALLC may refer to:

 Association for Literary and Linguistic Computing, former name of the European Association for Digital Humanities
 Atticus Limited Liability Company, an LLC formed to support the Broadway production of To Kill a Mockingbird
 ALLC (gene), from List of human protein-coding genes 1